The 1910 Victorian Football Association season was the 34th season of the Australian rules football competition. The premiership was won by the North Melbourne Football Club, after it defeated Brunswick by 29 points in the Grand Final on 8 October. It was the third premiership won by the club, and the first since it was reformed after briefly ceasing to exist in 1908.

Premiership 
The home-and-home season was played over eighteen rounds, with each club playing the others twice; then, the top four clubs contested a finals series under the amended Argus system to determine the premiers for the season.

Ladder

Finals

Notable events 
 Preston became the first club to concede more than 2,000 points in a season.
 Frank Caine was the Association's leading goalkicker for the season. He kicked 70 goals during the home-and-home matches, and 75 goals overall. Jack Hutchinson (Port Melbourne) was second with 54 goals.
 A new premiership trophy was donated to the Association, which would be awarded each year to the premiers, before being awarded permanently to the first club to win it twice consecutively or three times overall.

External links 
 Victorian Football Association/Victorian Football League history (1877–2008)
 List of VFA premiers

References 

Victorian Football League seasons
VFL